Gwenaël Berthet (born 4 August 1970) is a French yacht racer who competed in the 1996 Summer Olympics.

References

External links
 
 
 

1970 births
Living people
French male sailors (sport)
Olympic sailors of France
Sailors at the 1996 Summer Olympics – 470
20th-century French people